Caroline Ellen Furness (June 24, 1869 – February 9, 1936) was an American astronomer who taught at Vassar College in the early twentieth century. She studied under Mary Watson Whitney at Vassar and was the first woman to earn a PhD in astronomy from Columbia.

Furness was born on 24 June 1869 in Cleveland, Ohio. Her father was a high school science teacher and encouraged her early interest in science. She graduated from Vassar in 1887 and followed in her fathers footsteps becoming a high school science teacher, her true interest was in research though and after three years she returned to Vassar as a research assistant for Mary Watson Whitney. Under Whitney she took part in a nearly decade long program of comet and planet observations. In 1896 she began working at Columbia University under Harold Jacoby and would publish her Ph.D. dissertation "Catalogue of stars within one degree of the North pole and optical distortion of the Helsingfors astro-photographic telescope deduced from photographic measures" there in 1900. In 1903 she returned to Vassar as an instructor.

She collaborated on variable star observations with Whitney from 1909 to 1911. In 1915, she authored the authoritative textbook Introduction to the Study of Variable Stars.

She became a fellow of the Royal Astronomical Society in 1922.

She died on 9 February 1936 in New York City.

She was an advocate for women's education, particularly in other countries; she wrote a number of articles about the situation of women's higher education in Japan; she was an important member of the local branch of the National Alliance of Unitarian Women.

References 

1869 births
1936 deaths
American women astronomers
Columbia Graduate School of Arts and Sciences alumni
Vassar College alumni
Vassar College faculty
Scientists from Cleveland